Siget refers to:

 Siget, Zagreb, a neighbourhood in Zagreb, Croatia
 Siget, Novi Kneževac, a village near Novi Kneževac, Serbia
 Szigetvár, a small town in Baranya, Hungary
 Siget (Hasidic dynasty), a Hasidic dynasty originating from Sighetu Marmației